Arabia may refer to:

Geography
The Arabian Peninsula
Saudi Arabia, the largest country in the Arabian Peninsula
Arabia Deserta, the desert interior of the Arabian Peninsula in modern-day Saudi Arabia
Arabia Felix, modern-day Yemen and southwestern Saudi Arabia
Arabia Petraea, a Roman province
Arabia, Finland, a neighbourhood of Helsinki
Arabia, Indiana, a community in the United States
Arabia, Nebraska, a community in the United States
Arabia (satrapy), a satrapy (province) of the Achaemenid Empire and later of the Sassanid Empire, by the name of Arabistan

People
Arabia (daughter of Justin II), the daughter of Byzantine emperor Justin II (r. 565–578) and his empress Sophia

Language
A romanized spelling of `Arabīya = Arabic

Astronomy
1157 Arabia, an asteroid
Arabia Terra, a region of Mars' northern hemisphere
Arabia quadrangle, one of a series of 30 quadrangle maps of Mars used by the United States Geological Survey Astrogeology Research Program

Ships
RMS Arabia, a passenger liner sunk in World War I
Arabia (steamboat), sunk in the Missouri River in 1856 and excavated from 1988 to 1989
Arabia (barque), foundered in Lake Huron in 1884
, a United States Navy patrol vessel in commission during 1918

Other
Arabia (company), a Finnish ceramics manufacturer
Arabia (shopping centre), a shopping centre in Helsinki, Finland
 Arabia With Levison Wood, a travel documentary series

See also
Arab (disambiguation)
Arabian (disambiguation)
Arabistan (disambiguation)